The 1996 Women's Perrier World Open Squash Championship was the women's edition of the 1996 World Open, which serves as the individual world championship for squash players. The event took place in Petaling Jaya, Kuala Lumpur in Malaysia between 9 October and 13 October 1996. Sarah Fitzgerald won her first World Open title, defeating Cassie Jackman in the final.

Seeds

Draw and results

See also
World Open
1996 Men's World Open Squash Championship

References

External links
Womens World Open

World Squash Championships
1996 in Malaysian women's sport
Squash tournaments in Malaysia
1996 in women's squash
International sports competitions hosted by Malaysia